Big Buffalo Creek is a stream in Morgan and Benton counties in west-central Missouri. It is a tributary of the Osage River within the Lake of the Ozarks.

The stream headwaters arise just south of a fish hatchery about three miles southwest of Stover. The stream flows south and southwest passing south of Boylers Mill to enter Benton County and the Big Buffalo Creek Conservation Area. The stream turns to the south and enters the waters of Lake of the Ozarks at the community of Zora. Prior to the filling of the lake the stream channel met the Osage River just south of the community of Riverview.

The stream name was to distinguish it from Little Buffalo Creek which is also in Buffalo Township in Morgan County.

References

Rivers of Benton County, Missouri
Rivers of Morgan County, Missouri